Roberto Díaz (born 3 February 1987) is a Mexican professional golfer. He currently plays on the Korn Ferry Tour. He played collegiate golf for USC Aiken from 2005 to 2008 before turning professional in 2009.

Professional career
In 2017, Díaz lost in a playoff to Ethan Tracy at the Club Colombia Championship. The finish moved him from outside the top 700 in the Official World Golf Ranking to 462nd, which qualified him for the WGC-Mexico Championship by being the highest-ranked Mexican golfer. Díaz also qualified for the U.S. Open, his first major championship, when Phil Mickelson withdrew to attend his daughter's high school graduation. He would go on to shoot 72-76 to miss the cut. Diaz finished 25th in the 2017 Web.com Tour rankings, the last guaranteed position for a PGA Tour card.

After the 2018-19 PGA Tour season, Diaz lost his tour card and returned to the Korn Ferry Tour.

In March 2021, Diaz won the Chitimacha Louisiana Open on the Korn Ferry Tour by one stroke over Peter Uihlein.

Professional wins (1)

Korn Ferry Tour wins (1)

Korn Ferry Tour playoff record (0–1)

Results in major championships

CUT = missed the half-way cut

Results in World Golf Championships

"T" = Tied

Team appearances
Amateur
Eisenhower Trophy (representing Mexico): 2006, 2008

Professional
World Cup (representing Mexico): 2018

See also
2017 Web.com Tour Finals graduates
2018 Web.com Tour Finals graduates

References

External links

Mexican male golfers
PGA Tour golfers
Korn Ferry Tour graduates
Universiade medalists in golf
Universiade silver medalists for Mexico
Medalists at the 2007 Summer Universiade
USC Aiken Pacers athletes
Sportspeople from Veracruz
People from Myrtle Beach, South Carolina
1987 births
Living people
21st-century Mexican people